The Airtight Bridge is a steel bridge spanning the Embarras River in Coles County, Illinois, in the United States  north of Charleston, Illinois. The bridge is a Pratt through truss bridge  with a steel structure, a wooden deck, and concrete piers. The bridge was built in 1914 by the Decatur Bridge Company and designed by engineer Claude L. James. It was added to the National Register of Historic Places in 1981.  It reportedly got its name from the unnatural stillness encountered when crossing it.

In 1980, a dismembered corpse was found on the east bank of the river 30 yards downstream from the bridge, leading to significant local press attention.  Police investigated for years, but were unable to determine the identity of the victim until 1992, when DNA testing produced a match to a missing person from Kankakee, Illinois. Once a cold case investigated by the Illinois State Police, the victim's husband was charged with the murder on March 2, 2017.

Notes

External links
Airtight Bridge at the Association for the Preservation of Historic Coles County Illinois
Airtight Bridge at the Legends and Lore of Illinois
Murder at the Airtight Bridge
Airtight Bridge Murder Mystery (Archived 2009-10-24)
Jonathon Kirk's Experimental Radio Documentary focused on the murder at Airtight Bridge

Bridges completed in 1914
Bridges in Coles County, Illinois
Road bridges on the National Register of Historic Places in Illinois
National Register of Historic Places in Coles County, Illinois
Steel bridges in the United States
Pratt truss bridges in the United States
1914 establishments in Illinois